Wongan Hills is a town in the Shire of Wongan-Ballidu, in the Wheatbelt region of Western Australia. The town is approximately 182 km north of the state capital Perth, at an altitude of 286 metres.

The town is named for a nearby range of hills that are found to the north-west of the town, also named Wongan Hills, which was first recorded in 1836 by Surveyor General of Western Australia John Septimus Roe.

History
The area was settled by the 1900s, and in 1911 the town was gazetted and named after the range. "Wongan" is derived from the Indigenous Australian name "wangan-katta", "wanka" and "woongan". "Katta" is known to mean "hill", but the meaning of "wongan" is uncertain. It may be related to "kwongan", an indigenous word for sandplain, or "whispering", in which case "wongan katta" would mean "whispering hills" (katta is a word for hill).

In the early 1900s, poet Lilian Wooster Greaves lived with her family at Wongan Hills. Her book of poetry includes a number of prose and poetry items relating to living there at the time of World War I.

In 1925, an agricultural research station was established about 5 km north of the town, which assisted in the diversification of and improvements in farm practices through the state.
The area is a prosperous agricultural region with activities focused on sheep, grain and pig-farming.

Construction of a grain silo commenced in 1933 as part of the bulk handling scheme that had been introduced by the government and managed by Cooperative Bulk Handling.

As part of Easter celebrations in 2009, a  cross was laid out in a bare paddock using 460 half-tonne hay bales with the aid of GPS receivers. The cross was set alight on Good Friday night and was the end of a pilgrimage conducted on Easter Saturday.

Climate
Wongan Hills historically had a Mediterranean climate (Köppen Csa) however drying associated with widening of the Hadley cell has shifted the area in recent times to a hot semi-arid climate (BSh). The climate is similar to Northern Hemisphere areas on the southern Mediterranean Sea, such as Tripoli or Gaza City, though Wongan Hills' inland location produces hotter, less arid summers and cooler winters than those localities. Summers are hot to sweltering and generally arid, though occasionally tropical cyclones from the Indian Ocean will affect the region after moving inland, whilst winters are comfortable with cold nights and occasional showers.

References

External links 

 Shire of Wongan-Ballidu

Towns in Western Australia
Wheatbelt (Western Australia)
Grain receival points of Western Australia